Małgów  is a village in the administrative district of Gmina Lisków, within Kalisz County, Greater Poland Voivodeship, in west-central Poland.

References

Villages in Kalisz County